Ólöf Loftsdóttir (c. 1410 – 1479), was a politically active Icelandic woman. She was the daughter of judge Loftur ríki Guttormsson and Ingibjörg Pálsdóttir and married to judge Björn Þorleifsson hirðstjóri.

Kidnapping
In 1455, the couple was robbed and abducted by Scottish pirates outside Orkney and imprisoned in Scotland. They were released by a ransom paid by the Danish monarch King Christian I, who gave them the task of expelling all British traders from Iceland on his behalf. The couple issued a feud with the British traders working in Iceland upon their return. In 1467, her spouse was killed in action and her son was captured by British traders. She bought back her son and continued the war by herself as the representative of the Danish monarch, capturing numerous British traders, either enslaving them as a source of labor or expelling them from the island. Her activities caused British traders to flee the island en masse.

See also
List of kidnappings
List of solved missing person cases

Sources 
„Ólöf ríka á Skarði. Sunnudagsblað Tímans, 28. júní 1964.“,

1410 births
1479 deaths
Olof Loftsdottir
Formerly missing people
Olof Loftsdottir
Women in 15th-century warfare
Women in medieval European warfare